The Racketeer Influenced and Corrupt Organizations (RICO) Act is a United States federal law that provides for extended criminal penalties and a civil cause of action for acts performed as part of an ongoing criminal organization.

G. Robert Blakey, an adviser to the United States Senate Government Operations Committee, drafted the law under the close supervision of the committee's chairman, Senator John Little McClellan. It was enacted as Title IX of the Organized Crime Control Act of 1970, and signed into law by US President Richard M. Nixon. While its original use in the 1970s was to prosecute the Mafia as well as others who were actively engaged in organized crime, its later application has been more widespread.

Beginning in 1972, thirty-three states adopted state RICO laws to be able to prosecute similar conduct.

Summary 

Under RICO, a person who has committed "at least two acts of racketeering activity" drawn from a list of 35 crimes (27 federal crimes and eight state crimes) within a 10-year period can be charged with racketeering if such acts are related in one of four specified ways to an "enterprise." Those found guilty of racketeering can be fined up to $25,000 and sentenced to 20 years in prison per racketeering count. In addition, the racketeer must forfeit all ill-gotten gains and interest in any business gained through a pattern of "racketeering activity."

A US Attorney who decides to indict someone under RICO has the option of seeking a pre-trial restraining order or injunction to temporarily seize a defendant's assets and prevent the transfer of potentially forfeitable property and to require the defendant to put up a performance bond. That provision was placed in the law because the owners of Mafia-related shell corporations often absconded with the assets. An injunction or performance bond ensures that there is something to seize in the event of a guilty verdict.

In many cases, the threat of a RICO indictment can force defendants to plead guilty to lesser charges, in part because the seizure of assets would make it difficult to pay a defense attorney. Despite its harsh provisions, a RICO-related charge is considered easy to prove in court since it focuses on patterns of behavior, as opposed to criminal acts.

RICO also permits a private individual "damaged in his business or property" by a "racketeer" to file a civil suit. The plaintiff must prove the existence of an "enterprise." The defendant(s) are not the enterprise; in other words, the defendant(s) and the enterprise are not one and the same. There must be one of four specified relationships between the defendant(s) and the enterprise: either the defendant(s) invested the proceeds of the pattern of racketeering activity into the enterprise (18 U.S.C. § 1962(a)); or the defendant(s) acquired or maintained an interest in, or control of, the enterprise through the pattern of racketeering activity (subsection (b)); or the defendant(s) conducted or participated in the affairs of the enterprise "through" the pattern of racketeering activity (subsection (c)); or the defendant(s) conspired to do one of the above (subsection (d)). In essence, the enterprise is either the 'prize', 'instrument', 'victim', or 'perpetrator' of the racketeers. A civil RICO action can be filed in state or federal court.

Both the criminal and the civil components allow the recovery of treble damages (triple the amount of actual/compensatory damages).

Although its primary intent was to deal with organized crime, Blakey said that Congress never intended it merely to apply to the Mob. He once told Time, "We don't want one set of rules for people whose collars are blue or whose names end in vowels, and another set for those whose collars are white and have Ivy League diplomas."

The first-ever RICO trial was conducted in May 1979 in United States v. Sam Bailey Gang by Prosecutor Mark L. Webb in San Francisco, California, Northern District of California. The case was tried successfully by use of the RICO statute in alleging that a gang of postal burglars and a Nevada fence collaborated criminally in an organized crime fashion. The case did not involve a Mafia crime family. Subsequently, the RICO Act was first used by the US Attorney's Office in the Southern District of New York on September 18, 1979, in United States v. Scotto. Scotto, who was convicted on charges of racketeering, accepting unlawful labor payments, and income tax evasion, headed the International Longshoremen's Association. During the 1980s and the 1990s, federal prosecutors used the law to bring charges against several Mafia figures. The second major success was the Mafia Commission Trial, which ran from February 25, 1985, through November 19, 1986. Rudy Giuliani indicted 11 organized crime figures, including the heads of New York's so-called "Five Families," under the RICO Act on charges including extortion, labor racketeering, and murder for hire. Time magazine called the "Case of Cases" possibly "the most significant assault on the infrastructure of organized crime since the high command of the Chicago Mafia was swept away in 1943" and quoted Giuliani's stated intention: "Our approach is to wipe out the five families." The Gambino crime family boss Paul Castellano evaded conviction when he and his underboss, Thomas Bilotti, were murdered on the streets of Midtown Manhattan on December 16, 1985. However, three heads of the Five Families were sentenced to 100 years in prison on January 13, 1987. The Genovese and Colombo leaders, Tony Salerno and Carmine Persico received additional sentences in separate trials, with 70-year and 39-year sentences to run consecutively. He was assisted by three Assistant United States Attorneys: Michael Chertoff, the eventual second United States Secretary of Homeland Security and co-author of the Patriot Act; John Savarese, later a partner at Wachtell Lipton Rosen & Katz; and Gil Childers, a later deputy chief of the criminal division for the Southern District of New York and later managing director in the legal department at Goldman Sachs.

State laws 

Beginning in 1972, thirty-three states, as well as Puerto Rico and the United States Virgin Islands, adopted state RICO laws to cover additional state offenses under a similar scheme.

RICO predicate offenses

As currently amended it includes:

Any violation of state statutes against gambling, murder, kidnapping, extortion, arson, robbery, bribery, dealing in obscene matter, or dealing in a controlled substance or listed chemical (as defined in the Controlled Substances Act);
Any act of bribery, counterfeiting, theft, embezzlement, fraud, dealing in obscene matter, obstruction of justice, slavery, racketeering, gambling, money laundering, commission of murder-for-hire, and many other offenses covered under the Federal criminal code (Title 18);
Embezzlement of union funds;
Bankruptcy fraud or securities fraud;
Drug trafficking; long-term and elaborate drug networks can also be prosecuted using the Continuing Criminal Enterprise Statute;
Criminal copyright infringement;
Money laundering and related offenses;
Bringing in, aiding or assisting aliens in illegally entering the country (if the action was for financial gain);
Acts of terrorism.

Pattern of racketeering activity requires at least two acts of racketeering activity, one of which occurred after the effective date of this chapter and the last of which occurred within ten years (excluding any period of imprisonment) after the commission of a prior act of racketeering activity. The US Supreme Court has instructed federal courts to follow the continuity-plus-relationship test in order to determine whether the facts of a specific case give rise to an established pattern. The illegal acts comprising a pattern are called "predicate" offenses. Predicate acts are related if they "have the same or similar purposes, results, participants, victims, or methods of commission, or otherwise are interrelated by distinguishing characteristics and are not isolated events."  Continuity is both a closed and open ended concept, referring to either a closed period of conduct, or to past conduct that by its nature projects into the future with a threat of repetition.

Application of RICO laws

Although some of the RICO predicate acts are extortion and blackmail, one of the most successful applications of the RICO laws has been the ability to indict and or sanction individuals for their behavior and actions committed against witnesses and victims in alleged retaliation or retribution for cooperating with federal law enforcement or intelligence agencies.

Violations of the RICO laws can be alleged in civil lawsuit cases or for criminal charges. In these instances, charges can be brought against individuals or corporations in retaliation for said individuals or corporations working with law enforcement. Further, charges can also be brought against individuals or corporations who have sued or filed criminal charges against a defendant.

Anti-SLAPP (strategic lawsuit against public participation) laws can be applied in an attempt to curb alleged abuses of the legal system by individuals or corporations who use the courts as a weapon to retaliate against whistle blowers or victims or to silence another's speech. RICO could be alleged if it can be shown that lawyers or their clients conspired and collaborated to concoct fictitious legal complaints solely in retribution and retaliation for themselves having been brought before the courts.

Although the RICO laws may cover drug trafficking crimes in addition to other more traditional RICO predicate acts such as extortion, blackmail, and racketeering, large-scale and organized drug networks are now commonly prosecuted under the Continuing Criminal Enterprise Statute, also known as the "Kingpin Statute". The CCE laws target only traffickers who are responsible for long-term and elaborate conspiracies, whereas the RICO law covers a variety of organized criminal behaviors.

Civil provisions
The RICO statute contains a provision that allows for the commencement of a civil action by a private party to recover damages sustained as a result of the commission of a RICO predicate offense.

Famous cases

The Cowboy Mafia

RICO was instrumental in indicting members of The Cowboy Mafia from Texas, Tennessee and Florida. During 1977 and 1978, this group imported over 106 tons of marijuana. Using the shrimp boats Agnes Pauline, Monkey, Jubilee, and Bayou Blues, the group made six trips from Colombia to Texas. The group was arrested in 1978 after the federal government seized the Agnes Pauline when they were unloading their cargo in Port Arthur, Texas. In 1979, twenty-six members of the smuggling ring were convicted. Charles "Muscles" Foster, a ranch foreman and the head of the operation, pleaded innocent by reason of insanity and was acquitted in 1980. In August 1981, Rex Cauble was indicted by a grand jury, as the government believed he was the financial backer of the smugglers. Foster was the foreman for his ranches, and the drugs were transported to Cauble's ranches throughout Texas. Cauble was a multi-millionaire, the former chairman of the Texas Aeronautics Commission, and an honorary Texas Ranger. He was also the owner of Cutter Bill, a famous cutting horse. Cauble was convicted in January 1982 on ten counts: two counts of violating the Racketeer Influenced and Corrupt Organizations Act statute (RICO), conspiracy to violate RICO, three violations of the Interstate Commerce Travel Act, and four counts of misapplication of bank funds. He was sentenced to ten concurrent terms of five years. He completed his prison term, and was released in September 1987, and died in 2003. 

Three books about the group were published: The Cowboy Mafia (2003) by Cauble's personal jet pilot Roy Graham; Catching the Katy (2017) by Barker Milford; and A Conspiracy Revealed by DEA agent Daniel Wedeman, Sr.

As a result of the RICO conviction, Cauble forfeited his 31% interest in Cauble Enterprises, including two Cutter Bill Western World stores, three Texas banks (Western State Bank in Denton, Dallas International Bank and South Main Bank of Houston), six ranches, a welding supply company, and oil and gas holdings. The company's worth was estimated at $80 million. However, the government sold their interest back to the other partners (Cauble's wife and son) for an estimated $12 million.

Hells Angels Motorcycle Club
In 1979, the United States Federal Government went after Sonny Barger and several members and associates of the Oakland chapter of the Hells Angels using RICO. In United States vs. Barger, the prosecution team attempted to demonstrate a pattern of behavior to convict Barger and other members of the club of RICO offenses related to guns and illegal drugs. The jury acquitted Barger on the RICO charges with a hung jury on the predicate acts: "There was no proof it was part of club policy, and as much as they tried, the government could not come up with any incriminating minutes from any of our meetings mentioning drugs and guns."

Latin Kings
Several members of the Latin Kings have been convicted of RICO offenses.

Gil Dozier

Louisiana Commissioner of Agriculture and Forestry Gil Dozier, in office from 1976 to 1980, faced indictment with violations of both the Hobbs and the RICO laws. He was accused of compelling companies doing business with his department to make campaign contributions on his behalf. On September 23, 1980, the Baton Rouge-based United States District Court for the Middle District of Louisiana convicted Dozier of five counts of extortion and racketeering. The sentence of ten years imprisonment, later upgraded to eighteen when other offenses were determined, and a $25,000 fine was suspended pending appeal, and Dozier remained free on bail. He eventually served nearly four years until a presidential commutation freed him in 1986.

Key West Police Department
Around June 1984, the Key West Police Department located in Monroe County, Florida, was declared a criminal enterprise under the federal RICO statutes after a lengthy United States Department of Justice investigation. Several high-ranking officers of the department, including Deputy Police Chief Raymond Cassamayor, were arrested on federal charges of running a protection racket for illegal cocaine smugglers. At trial, a witness testified he routinely delivered bags of cocaine to the Deputy Chief's office at City Hall.

Michael Milken
On March 29, 1989, American financier Michael Milken was indicted on 98 counts of racketeering and fraud relating to an investigation into an allegation of insider trading and other offenses. Milken was accused of using a wide-ranging network of contacts to manipulate stock and bond prices. It was one of the first occasions that a RICO indictment was brought against an individual with no ties to organized crime. Milken pleaded guilty to six lesser felonies of securities fraud and tax evasion, rather than risk spending the rest of his life in prison and ended up serving 22 months in prison. Milken was also ordered banned for life from the securities industry.

On September 7, 1988, Milken's employer, Drexel Burnham Lambert, was threatened with RICO charges under respondeat superior, the legal doctrine that corporations are responsible for their employees' crimes. Drexel avoided RICO charges by entering an Alford plea to lesser felonies of stock parking and stock manipulation. In a carefully worded plea, Drexel said it was "not in a position to dispute the allegations" made by the Government. If Drexel had been indicted under RICO statutes, it would have had to post a performance bond of up to $1 billion to avoid having its assets frozen. That would have taken precedence over all of the firm's other obligations, including the loans that provided 96 percent of its capital base. If the bond ever had to be paid, its shareholders would have been practically wiped out. Since banks will not extend credit to a firm indicted under RICO, an indictment would have likely put Drexel out of business. By at least one estimate, a RICO indictment would have destroyed the firm within a month. Years later, Drexel President and CEO Fred Joseph said that Drexel had no choice but to plead guilty because "a financial institution cannot survive a RICO indictment."

Major League Baseball
In 2001, Major League Baseball team owners voted to eliminate two teams, presumably the Minnesota Twins and Montreal Expos. In 2002, the former minority owners of the Expos filed charges under the RICO Act against MLB commissioner Bud Selig and former Expos owner Jeffrey Loria, claiming that Selig and Loria deliberately conspired to devalue the team for personal benefit in preparation for a move. If found liable, Major League Baseball could have been responsible for up to $300 million in punitive damages. The case lasted two years, successfully stalling the Expos' move to Washington or contraction during that time. It was eventually sent to arbitration, where the arbiters ruled in favor of Major League Baseball, permitting the move to Washington to take place.

Los Angeles Police Department 

In April 2000, federal judge William J. Rea in Los Angeles, ruling in one Rampart scandal case, said that the plaintiffs could pursue RICO claims against the LAPD, an unprecedented finding. In July 2001, US District Judge Gary A. Feess said that the plaintiffs did not have standing to sue the LAPD under RICO, because they were alleging personal injuries rather than economic or property damage.

Mohawk Industries 

On April 26, 2006, the Supreme Court heard Mohawk Industries, Inc. v. Williams, which concerned what sort of corporations fell under the scope of RICO. Mohawk Industries had allegedly hired illegal aliens, in violation of RICO. The court was asked to decide whether Mohawk Industries, along with recruiting agencies, constituted an "enterprise" that could be prosecuted under RICO. However, in June of that year, the court dismissed the case and remanded it to the US Court of Appeals.

Gambino crime family
John Gotti and Frank Locascio were convicted on April 2, 1992, under the RICO Act and later sentenced to life in prison.

In Tampa, on October 16, 2006, four members of the Gambino crime family (Capo Ronald Trucchio, Terry Scaglione, Steven Catallono, and Anthony Mucciarone and associate Kevin McMahon) were tried under RICO statutes, found guilty, and sentenced to life in prison.

Lucchese crime family
In the mid-1990s, prosecuting attorneys Gregory O'Connell and Charles Rose used RICO charges to bring down the Lucchese family within an 18-month period. Dismantling the Lucchese family had a profound financial impact on previously Mafia held businesses such as construction, garment, and garbage hauling. Here they dominated and extorted money through taxes, dues, and fees. An example of this extortion was through the garbage business. Hauling of garbage from the World Trade Center cost the building owners $1.2 million per year to be removed when the Mafia monopolized the business, as compared to $150,000 per year when competitive bids could be sought.

Bonanno crime family 

Bonanno crime family boss Joseph Massino's trial began on May 24, 2004, with judge Nicholas Garaufis presiding and Greg D. Andres and Robert Henoch heading the prosecution. He now faced 11 RICO counts for seven murders (due to the prospect of prosecutors seeking the death penalty for the Sciascia murder, that case was severed to be tried separately), arson, extortion, loansharking, illegal gambling, and money laundering. After deliberating for five days, the jury found Massino guilty of all 11 counts on July 30, 2004. His sentencing was initially scheduled for October 12, and he was expected to receive a sentence of life imprisonment with no possibility of parole. The jury also approved the prosecutors' recommended $10 million forfeiture of the proceeds of his reign as Bonanno boss on the day of the verdict.

Immediately after his July 30 conviction, as court was adjourned, Massino requested a meeting with Judge Garaufis, where he made his first offer to cooperate. He did so in hopes of sparing his life; he was facing the death penalty if found guilty of Sciascia's murder. Indeed, one of John Ashcroft's final acts as Attorney General was to order federal prosecutors to seek the death penalty for Massino. Massino thus stood to be the first Mafia boss to be executed for his crimes, and the first mob boss to face the death penalty since Lepke Buchalter was executed in 1944. Massino was the first sitting boss of a New York crime family to turn state's evidence, and the second in the history of the American Mafia to do so (Philadelphia crime family boss Ralph Natale had flipped in 1999 when facing drug charges).

Chicago Outfit 

In 2005, the US Department of Justice's Operation Family Secrets indicted 14 Chicago Outfit (also known as the Outfit, the Chicago Mafia, the Chicago Mob, or the Organization) members and associates under RICO predicates. Five defendants were convicted of RICO violations and other crimes. Six pleaded guilty, two died before trial, and one was too sick to be tried.

Michael Conahan and Mark Ciavarella
A federal grand jury in the Middle District of Pennsylvania handed down a 48-count indictment against former Luzerne County Court of Common Pleas Judges Michael Conahan and Mark Ciavarella. The judges were charged with RICO after allegedly committing acts of mail and wire fraud, tax evasion, money laundering, and honest services fraud. The judges were accused of taking kickbacks for housing juveniles, that the judges convicted of mostly petty crimes, at a private detention center. The incident was dubbed by many local and national newspapers as the "kids for cash scandal". On February 18, 2011, a federal jury found Mark Ciavarella guilty of racketeering because of his involvement in accepting illegal payments from Robert Mericle, the developer of PA Child Care, and Attorney Robert Powell, a co-owner of the facility. Ciavarella is facing 38 other counts in federal court.

Scott W. Rothstein 

Scott W. Rothstein is a disbarred lawyer and the former managing shareholder, chairman, and chief executive officer of the now-defunct Rothstein Rosenfeldt Adler law firm. He was accused of funding his philanthropy, political contributions, law firm salaries, and an extravagant lifestyle with a massive 1.2 billion dollar Ponzi scheme. On December 1, 2009, Rothstein turned himself in to federal authorities and was subsequently arrested on charges related to RICO. Although his arraignment plea was not guilty, Rothstein cooperated with the government and reversed his plea to guilty of five federal crimes on January 27, 2010. Bond was denied by US Magistrate Judge Robin Rosenbaum, who ruled that due to his ability to forge documents, he was considered a flight risk. On June 9, 2010, Rothstein received a 50-year prison sentence after a hearing in federal court in Fort Lauderdale.

AccessHealthSource
Eleven defendants were indicted on RICO charges for allegedly assisting AccessHealthSource, a local health care provider, in obtaining and maintaining lucrative contracts with local and state government entities in the city of El Paso, Texas, "through bribery of and kickbacks to elected officials or himself and others, extortion under color of authority, fraudulent schemes and artifices, false pretenses, promises and representations and deprivation of the right of citizens to the honest services of their elected local officials" (see indictment).

FIFA

Fourteen defendants affiliated with FIFA were indicted under the RICO act on 47 counts for "racketeering, wire fraud and money laundering conspiracies, among other offenses, in connection with the defendants' participation in a 24-year scheme to enrich themselves through the corruption of international soccer". The defendants include many current and former high-ranking officers of FIFA and its affiliate CONCACAF. The defendants had allegedly used the enterprise as a front to collect millions of dollars in bribes, which may have influenced Russia and Qatar's winning bids to host the FIFA World Cup in 2018 and 2022, respectively.

Drummond Company
In 2015, the Drummond Company sued attorneys Terrence P. Collingsworth and William R. Scherer, the advocacy group International Rights Advocates (IRAdvocates), and Dutch businessman Albert van Bilderbeek, one of the owners of Llanos Oil, accusing them of violating RICO by alleging that Drummond had worked alongside Autodefensas Unidas de Colombia to murder labor union leaders within proximity of their Colombian coal mines, which Drummond denies.

Connecticut Senator Len Fasano
In 2005, a federal jury ordered Fasano to pay $500,000 under RICO for illegally helping a client hide their assets in a bankruptcy case.

Lechter v. Aprio 

In the North Georgia case Lechter v. Aprio, an Atlanta, Georgia accounting firm named Aprio, LLP was sued by clients for involving them in a tax avoidance scheme using conservation easements. In the complaint, David Deary, an attorney for the plaintiff, stated, "This is the exact kind of conduct that the civil RICO statute was designed to remedy, where you have a bunch of professional advisers that put together a scheme in secret manipulating a bunch of technical rules that laymen don't understand to deprive people of their money." Specifically, the claim cites violations of the Racketeer Influenced and Corrupt Organizations Act ("RICO"), 18 U.S.C. §§1961–1968, violations of the Georgia RICO statute, O.C.G.A. § 16-4-1, et seq.

The case is being followed for its implications regarding the use of conservation easements as tax shelters. An article in Bloomberg Tax states: "A class-action claiming that the promoters of syndicated conservation easements knew from the outset that their deals violated tax laws is a new legal avenue for aggrieved investors as the Internal Revenue Service and the Justice Department grind through their own crackdowns."

See also 

Continuing Criminal Enterprise
Criminal Tribes Act
Patriot Act

References

Bagchi, Aysha. Bloomberg Tax. "Participants in IRS-Targeted Land Deals Sue Alleged Promoters". March 27, 2020.

Further reading
 Criminal RICO: 18 U.S.C. 1961–1968: A Manual for Federal Prosecutors. Washington, D.C.: U.S. Dept. of Justice, Criminal Division, Organized Crime and Racketeering Section, [2009].
 United States. Congress. House. Committee on the Judiciary. Subcommittee No. 5. Organized Crime Control. Hearings ... Ninety-first Congress, Second Session on S.30, and Related Proposals, Relating to the Control of Organized Crime in the U.S. [held] May 20, 21, 27; June 10, 11, 17; July 23, and August 5, 1970. Washington, D.C.: U.S. Government Printing Office, 1970.

External links
 As codified in 18 U.S.C. chapter 96 of the United States Code from the LII
 As codified in 18 U.S.C. chapter 96 of the United States Code from the US House of Representatives

 
1970 in law
91st United States Congress
Organized crime terminology
Organized crime in the United States
United States federal criminal legislation
American Mafia events
Inchoate offenses
United States federal public corruption crime
Acts related to organized crime